Haslett Hawkesworth "Housie" Grounds (9 September 1903 – 27 July 1963) was an Australian rules footballer who played with St Kilda in the Victorian Football League (VFL).

Notes

External links 

1903 births
1963 deaths
Australian rules footballers from Victoria (Australia)
St Kilda Football Club players
People educated at Melbourne Grammar School
People educated at Scotch College, Melbourne